Dan Cashman (November 15, 1933 - February 9, 2019) was an American actor.

Cashman narrated a total of 14 of the audiobooks for Books on Tape. Some of the books he narrated are Murdering Mr. Lincoln: A New Detection of the 19th Century's Most Famous Crime by author Charles Higham.

Cashman appeared on such television shows as Dangerous Women, Silk Stalkings, The Invisible Man and The Pretender as Sydney's brother Jacob. His latest appearance on television was in The Perfect Husband: The Laci Peterson Story, a 2004 film. Cashman also narrated the 2007 film Rocket Science.

Filmography

References

External links

1933 births
American male television actors
People from Minneapolis
Audiobook narrators
2019 deaths
Male actors from Memphis, Tennessee
Place of death missing